Mallam may refer to:

People 
 Cliff Mallam (1909–2006), Australian politician from New South Wales
 Julia Mallam (born 1982), British actress
 Mujitaba Mohammed Mallam (born 1960), Nigerian educator and politician from Jigawa State
 Kaka Mallam Yale (born 1953), Nigerian farmer and politician from Borno State
 Mallam Yahaya (born 1974), Ghanaian footballer

Places 
 Mallam (town), a residential town in the Greater Accra Region of Ghana
 Mallam Atta market, a major commercial market in Mallam town, Ghana
 Mallam Interchange, a dual carriage road system flyover in Accra, Ghana
 Garun Mallam, a Local Government Area in Kano State, Nigeria
 Mallam, Nellore District, a village in Andhra Pradesh, India

Other uses
 Mallam, an African title